St Helena's Church, West Leake is a parish church in the Church of England in West Leake, Nottinghamshire.

The church is Grade II* listed by the Department for Digital, Culture, Media and Sport as it is a particularly significant building of more than local interest. The grade II listed lychgate is possibly by the architect Temple Moore.

History
The church was medieval, parts of the north wall dating from the 12th century but restored in 1878 by the architect Henry Hall for Edward Strutt, 1st Baron Belper.

Pipe organ
The church has a two manual pipe organ by J.M. Grunwell of Derby, dating from 1878. A specification for the organ can be found on the National Pipe Organ Register.

Church bells
The church has two bells in an open turret. The bells were manufactured by Taylor's of Loughborough.

Current parish status
It is in a group of parishes which includes:
St Giles' Church, Costock
St Mary's Church, East Leake
All Saints' Church, Rempstone
St Helena's Church, West Leake
Church of St John the Baptist, Stanford on Soar

References

External links
St Helena West Leake at Southwell and Nottingham Church History website Project

Church of England church buildings in Nottinghamshire
Grade II* listed churches in Nottinghamshire